Eurythenes obesus is a species of amphipod of the genus Eurythenes. It was first described in 1905 by Édouard Chevreux.

Eurythenes obesus is found most from the Caribbean to the Antarctic regions but can be found in most ocean basins.

References

Eurythenes
Crustaceans described in 1905